Canchungo is a town located in the western Cacheu Region of Guinea-Bissau formerly known as Vila Teixeira Pinto after Major João Teixeira Pinto, the Portuguese colonial officer who had pacified the area.

Population 6,434 (2008 est).

References

External links

Populated places in Guinea-Bissau